A Taste of Honey is the debut album by the American rhythm and blues group A Taste of Honey. It was produced by Fonce Mizell and Larry Mizell for Sky High Productions and included the number one pop, soul and disco classic "Boogie Oogie Oogie".

Critical reception 
Reviewing in Christgau's Record Guide: Rock Albums of the Seventies (1981), Robert Christgau wrote: "Those who cite 'Boogie Oogie Oogie' as definitive disco dumbness should reread the lyrics of 'Tutti Frutti' and think about the great tradition of the left-field girl-group novelty—'Mr. Lee,' 'Iko Iko,' 'Shame, Shame, Shame.' But though a couple of other songs here, notably 'Distant,' indicate that their pan may flash again, late converts are advised to seek out the single and wish they could buy the disco disc."

Track listing

Personnel 
Janice-Marie Johnson – lead vocals, bass
Hazel P. Payne – lead vocals, guitars
Perry L. Kibble – keyboards
Donald Ray Johnson – drums
Wade Marcus - string arrangements
Larkin Arnold - executive producer

Charts

Weekly charts

Year-end charts

Single

References

External links
 A Taste Of Honey-A Taste Of Honey at Discogs
 A Taste Of Honey-Billboard Albums at AllMusic
 A Taste Of Honey-Billboard Singles at AllMusic

1978 debut albums
A Taste of Honey (band) albums
Albums arranged by Wade Marcus
Albums produced by the Mizell Brothers
Capitol Records albums